Siccia eberti is a moth in the family Erebidae. It was described by Lars Kühne in 2007. It is found in Zimbabwe.

References

Endemic fauna of Zimbabwe
Moths described in 2007
Nudariina